Wang Jinping (born 7 March 1987, in Heilongjiang) is a female Chinese athletics sprinter, who represented her country at the 4 × 400 m relay event at the 2008 Summer Olympics.

Personal best
2008 Asian Grand Prix - 2nd 4x400 relay

References
http://2008teamchina.olympic.cn/index.php/personview/personsen/5537
https://web.archive.org/web/20080826140534/http://results.beijing2008.cn/WRM/ENG/INF/AT/C73E/ATW404902.shtml

1987 births
Living people
Athletes (track and field) at the 2008 Summer Olympics
Chinese female sprinters
Olympic athletes of China
Runners from Heilongjiang
Olympic female sprinters
21st-century Chinese women